Merwin ("Marvin") B. Graham (March 4, 1903 – January 24, 1989) was an American track and field athlete who competed in the 1924 Summer Olympics. He was born in Fairview, West Virginia, attended high school in Bartlesville, Oklahoma and later attended the University of Kansas, where he was a member of the KU track team. In 1924 he finished ninth in the Olympic triple jump competition in Paris, France.

References

External links
Personal Papers of Merwin Graham at University of Kansas
profile

1903 births
1989 deaths
People from Bartlesville, Oklahoma
Olympic track and field athletes of the United States
Athletes (track and field) at the 1924 Summer Olympics
American male triple jumpers
University of Kansas alumni